Larry Ray Faulkner (born November 26, 1944) is an American academic and businessman. He served as the twenty-seventh president of The University of Texas at Austin from 1998 to 2006, and as the president of the Houston Endowment Inc. from 2006 to 2012.

Biography

Early life
Originally from Shreveport, Louisiana, Faulkner obtained his Bachelor of Science degree in chemistry at Southern Methodist University in 1966 and his Ph.D. in chemistry from the University of Texas at Austin.

Career
He taught chemistry at the University of Texas, the University of Illinois, and Harvard University. He served as provost and vice chancellor for academic affairs at the University of Illinois. He served as president of the University of Texas at Austin from 1998 to 2006. On June 30, 2005, he announced that he would step down from his post in the spring of 2006. In December 2005, William C. Powers was officially named his successor and took office in February 2006. On February 9, 2006, The University of Texas System Board of Regents named Faulkner president emeritus, one of the system's highest distinctions. From 2006 to 2008, he chaired the National Mathematics Advisory Panel, a panel appointed by President George W. Bush to advise the President and the United States Secretary of Education on the best use of scientifically based research to advance the teaching and learning of mathematics. The final report of this panel, Foundations for Success, was released on March 13, 2008. The impact of this report on the writing of the Common Core State Standards for Mathematics can be seen in the latter's treatment of algebra. On August 13, 2010, the University of Texas at Austin's nanoscience building was named the Larry R. Faulkner Nano Science and Technology Building by the UT System Board of Regents in recognition of former president Faulkner's leadership in bringing the university's nanotechnology program to national prominence.

He sat on the board of directors of Guaranty Bank from December 2007 to August 2009, and of Temple-Inland from August 2005 to February 2012. He serves on the board of ExxonMobil.

Honors and awards
2000 Acheson Award by the Electrochemical Society

Notes

References

Bibliography

External links
The University of Texas at Austin: A President's Legacy: Larry R. Faulkner

Directors of ExxonMobil
Presidents of the University of Texas at Austin
Southern Methodist University alumni
Living people
1944 births
Presidents of the Electrochemical Society